Randabygda or Hopland is a village in Stryn Municipality in Vestland county, Norway. The village is located on the northern shore of the Nordfjorden on a rather steep sloping area along the fjord. Randabygd Church is located in this village. The village is divided by the river Hoplandselva, where Hopland lies to the west and Randabygda lies to the east.

References

Villages in Vestland
Stryn